Knudsen's First Cabinet governed Norway between 19 March 1908 and 2 February 1910. It had the following composition:

Cabinet members

|}

State Secretary
Not to be confused with the modern title State Secretary. The old title State Secretary, used between 1814 and 1925, is now known as Secretary to the Government (Regjeringsråd).

Nils Otto Hesselberg

References
Gunnar Knudsen's First Government. 19 March 1908 – 2 February 1910 – Government.no

Notes

Knudsen 1
Knudsen 1
1908 establishments in Norway
1910 disestablishments in Norway
Cabinets established in 1908
Cabinets disestablished in 1910